Rings Around the Moon, or Ring around the Moon, or variation, may refer to:

 Rings Around the Moon (album), a 1978 album by Frank Carillo
 "Rings Around the Moon" (song), a 1997 song by the Bee Gees from Still Waters
 Ring Around the Moon (film), 1936 film
 "Ring Around the Moon" (Space: 1999), a 1976 episode of Space: 1999
 Ring Round the Moon, a play by Jean Anouilh adapted by Christopher Fry
 Moon ring, a weather phenomenon during which a large whitish ring circles the Moon
 Ring system, or debris ring, for a moon

See also
 Ring (disambiguation)
 Moon (disambiguation)